Viktor Illich Mikhalchuk (born 5 February 1946) is a Ukrainian former volleyball player who competed for the Soviet Union in the 1968 Summer Olympics.

He was born in the Barnaul, Russian SFSR.

In 1968, he was part of the Soviet team which won the gold medal in the Olympic tournament. He played eight matches.

External links
 profile

1946 births
Living people
Ukrainian men's volleyball players
Soviet men's volleyball players
Olympic volleyball players of the Soviet Union
Volleyball players at the 1968 Summer Olympics
Olympic gold medalists for the Soviet Union
Olympic medalists in volleyball
Russian men's volleyball players
Sportspeople from Barnaul
Medalists at the 1968 Summer Olympics
Honoured Masters of Sport of the USSR
K. D. Ushinsky South Ukrainian National Pedagogical University alumni